Dance of Death is a novel by American authors Douglas Preston and Lincoln Child, published on June 2, 2005 by Warner Books. This is the sixth book in the Special Agent Pendergast series. Also, this novel is the second book in the Diogenes trilogy: the first book is Brimstone, released in 2004, and the last book is The Book of the Dead, released in 2006.

Synopsis
The book follows FBI Special Agent Aloysius Pendergast and his sidekick, Lieutenant Vincent D'Agosta. Pendergast was last seen at the end of the previous novel, Brimstone, where he was buried alive behind a brick wall in Castel Fosco. His estranged brother, Diogenes, rescues him and nurses him back to health. However this is not a true act of kindness; Diogenes has a dark agenda and needs his brother alive in order to carry out his nefarious plans.

Pendergast's ward Constance Greene requests Vincent D'Agosta's presence for a very important meeting. D'Agosta is shown a letter written many months previously by Pendergast about his brother Diogenes. In the letter, Pendergast writes that he does not know of Diogenes's whereabouts, but does in fact know one thing—a date, January 28. D'Agosta presumes that this will be the date of Diogenes's greatest crime. Having been hated by and hating his family, Diogenes obviously cannot be trusted.

Reviews
Reviews of the book were generally positive. Publishers Weekly noted that "While it's not as good as some of their earlier efforts, it's still pretty darn good." Similarly, Barbara Lipkien of Bookreporter wrote that "Dance of Death may be a bit more melodramatic than the others in this series, but overall the book holds up." Writing for the Library Journal, Jim Ayers called the novel "A rare second book in a trilogy that actually improves on the first." Reviewers also commented favorably on the cliffhanger ending.

References

External links

Official website

2005 American novels
Techno-thriller novels
Sequel novels
American thriller novels
Novels by Douglas Preston
Novels by Lincoln Child
Collaborative novels